LibTIFF is a library for reading and writing Tagged Image File Format (abbreviated TIFF) files. The set also contains command line tools for processing TIFFs. It is distributed in source code and can be found as binary builds for all kinds of platforms.  The LibTIFF software was originally written by Sam Leffler while working for Silicon Graphics.

Features
Support for BigTIFF, files larger than 4 GiB, was included for LibTIFF 4.0.

Exploits
A TIFF file is composed of small descriptor blocks containing offsets into the file which point to a variety of data types. Incorrect offset values can cause programs to attempt to read erroneous portions of the file or attempt to read past the physical end of file. Improperly encoded packet or line lengths within the file can cause rendering programs which lack appropriate boundary checks to overflow their internal buffers.

Multiple buffer overflows have been found in LibTIFF.  Some of these have also been used to execute unsigned code on the PlayStation Portable, as well as run third-party applications on the iPhone and iPod Touch firmware.

Website hijacking
Around January 2004, the original LibTIFF website had been hijacked, after it had disappeared in September 2003 due to ISP problems. The libtiff dot org site contains a very outdated mirror of the real site, and much of the information contained therein is incorrect, including the current version number, authors, mailing list address, and the CVS information.

In September 2016, the LibTIFF maintainers lost control of remotesensing.org/libtiff/, which had been the main site since 2003.

References

External links

LibTIFF Mailing list Archive
LibTiff.NET - .NET version of LibTIFF

Graphics libraries
Software using the BSD license